The 2008–09 New Zealand Figure Skating Championships was held at the Ice Sports Southland in Gore from 28 September through 3 October 2008. Skaters competed in the disciplines of men's singles, ladies' singles, and synchronized skating across many levels, including senior, junior, novice, adult, and the pre-novice disciplines of juvenile, pre-Primary, primary, and intermediate.

Senior results

Men

Ladies

Synchronized

External links
 2008–09 New Zealand Figure Skating Championships results

2008 in figure skating
New Zealand Figure Skating Championships
Figure Skating
September 2008 sports events in New Zealand
October 2008 sports events in New Zealand